Offenbach am Main is a city in Hesse, Germany, on the left bank of the river Main. It borders Frankfurt and is part of the Frankfurt urban area and the larger Frankfurt Rhein-Main urban area. It has a population of 138,335 (December 2018).

In the 20th century, the city's economy was built on machine-building, leather-making, typography and design, and the automobile and pharmaceutical industries.

Geography

Subdivision
The inner city area of Offenbach is quite large and consists of the historic center of the city and its expansions of the 1800s. Three formerly independent suburbs were incorporated in the first half of the 20th century: Bürgel being the first in 1908, then Bieber and Rumpenheim in 1938 and 1942.

South of the inner city area are the suburbs Lauterborn, Rosenhöhe and Tempelsee. Kaiserlei is a commercial district in the far west of the city bordering Frankfurt. In the west Waldheim is a residential neighborhood on the city limits with Mühlheim am Main. In 2010 the eastern part of the city center was officially named Mathildenviertel, as the area was already unofficially called by the locals.

Unlike most larger cities in Germany, Offenbach was not completely divided into districts. Only the nine neighborhoods mentioned above were officially districts, leaving the largest parts of the city officially unnamed. Although specific names for neighborhoods and areas were already in use among the locals and residents.

In June 2019 the city council approved a new act that subdivides the city's area entirely into 21 districts. The nine existing districts largely remained the same, most of them were even expanded. The new districts were laid out after the already by locals commonly known neighborhoods, such as the Westend, the Nordend or Buchhügel. A completely new name was only needed to be found for one neighborhood south of the city center, which never had commonly used name before: Lindenfeld. The name derived from an old name of a land lot in this area, when it was still fields in agricultural use prior to the 1800s.

As of July 2019 there are the following 21 districts:

Bieber
Bieberer Berg
Buchhügel
Buchrain
Bürgel
Carl-Ulrich-Siedlung
Hafen
Kaiserlei
Lauterborn
Lindenfeld
Mathildenviertel
Musikerviertel
Nordend
Offenbach-Ost
Rosenhöhe
Rumpenheim
Senefelderquartier
Tempelsee
Waldheim
Westend
Zentrum

Climate
Offenbach experiences a humid subtropical climate (Köppen climate classification Cfa). There are subtropical summers with warm to hot temperatures ranging from 29.8 °C at daytime and 6.9 °C at night. Winters are temperate cool and mild with temperatures ranging from 17.9 °C at daytime and 2.5 °C at night. Due to its location in the Upper Rhine Plain, the whole Rhein-Main Metropolitan Region generally experiences one of the warmest climates in Germany, making it possible to grow plants from the subtropics such as vineyards, palm trees and olive trees.

History

The first documented reference to a suburb of Offenbach appears in 770. In a document of the Holy Roman Emperor Otto II dating to 977 exists the first mention of the place of Offenbach.  During the Middle Ages Offenbach passed through many hands. Only in 1486 could the Count Ludwig of Isenburg finally take control of city for his family, and 1556 Count Reinhard of Isenburg relocated his Residence to Offenbach, building a palace, the Isenburger Schloß (Isenburg Palace), which was completed in 1559. It was destroyed by fire in 1564 and rebuilt in 1578.

In 1635, Offenbach was given to the Landgraves of Hesse-Darmstadt, but it was returned to the Isenburg-Birstein Count (later Prince) in 1642. It remained in that principality until 1815, when the Congress of Vienna gave the city to the Austrian Emperor, Francis I. A year later it was given to the Grand Duchy of Hesse-Darmstadt.

Always very close to the city centre of Frankfurt, Offenbach was a popular location for business. The town has its own trade fair, and many companies have opened facilities here because there are fewer restrictions and no closed businesses. French Protestants (Huguenots) came in the 17th century and settled in Offenbach and contributed to making Offenbach a prosperous city, e.g., bringing knowledge of tobacco with them and turning Offenbach into a centre for rolling cigars. The town was more cosmopolitan than Frankfurt; famous people such as Goethe and Mozart visited it several times.

The Rumpenheim Palace and its park were a popular destination for monarchs in the 19th century. The city was thereafter ruled by Grand Dukes of Hesse and by Rhine until the monarchy was abolished in 1918. Offenbach became the center of the traditional design with figures such as the architect Hugo Eberhardt, the typographer Rudolf Koch, the bookbinder and designer Ignatz Wiemeler and Ernst Engel and the painter Karl Friedrich Lippmann.

During the Second World War a third of the city was destroyed by Allied bombing, which claimed 467 lives. With the new district Lauterborn the city was expanded to the south in the 1960s. On the border with Frankfurt, the office district Kaiserlei was built. Offenbach is a so-called "Sozialer Brennpunkt" ("multiple social problems area") because of unemployment, poverty, gang related crime and migration.

Before its eradication in the Holocaust, the city had a Jewish population. Jews settled in the city as late as the late 16th century, and it is believed that out of the 871 residents of the town as of 1829, the 40 Jewish families comprised nearly a quarter of the town's population. They also established their own cemetery.

Governance

Mayor 

The current mayor of Offenbach is Felix Schwenke of the Social Democratic Party (SPD). He was elected in 2017.

The most recent mayoral election was held on 10 September 2017, with a runoff held on 24 September, and the results were as follows:

! rowspan=2 colspan=2| Candidate
! rowspan=2| Party
! colspan=2| First round
! colspan=2| Second round
|-
! Votes
! %
! Votes
! %
|-
| bgcolor=| 
| align=left| Felix Schwenke
| align=left| Social Democratic Party
| 12,076
| 43.3
| 26,408
| 66.9
|-
| bgcolor=| 
| align=left| Peter Freier
| align=left| Christian Democratic Union
| 7,918
| 28.4
| 13,062
| 33.1
|-
| bgcolor=| 
| align=left| Peter Schneider
| align=left| Alliance 90/The Greens
| 3,963
| 14.2
|-
| bgcolor=| 
| align=left| Christin Thüne
| align=left| Alternative for Germany
| 1,476
| 5.3
|-
| bgcolor=| 
| align=left| Elke Kreiß
| align=left| The Left
| 1,032
| 3.7
|-
| 
| align=left| Muhsin Senol
| align=left| Forum New Offenbach
| 916
| 3.3
|-
| bgcolor=| 
| align=left| Helge Herget
| align=left| Pirate Party Germany
| 520
| 1.9
|-
! colspan=3| Valid votes
! 27,901
! 99.3
! 39,470
! 97.4
|-
! colspan=3| Invalid votes
! 209
! 0.7
! 1,061
! 2.6
|-
! colspan=3| Total
! 28,110
! 100.0
! 40,531
! 100.0
|-
! colspan=3| Electorate/voter turnout
! 91,924
! 30.6
! 92,115
! 44.0
|-
| colspan=7| Source: City of Offenbach (1st round, 2nd round)
|}

The following is a list of mayors since 1824:

1824–1826: Peter Georg d'Orville
1826–1834: Heinrich Philipp Schwaner
1834–1837: Peter Georg d'Orville
1837–1849: Jonas Budden
1849–1859: Friedrich August Schäfer
1859–1867: Johann Heinrich Dick
1867–1874: Johann Martin Hirschmann
1874–1882: Hermann Stölting
1883–1907: Wilhelm Brink
1907–1919: Andreas Dullo
1919–1933: Max Granzin
1947–1949: Johannes Rebholz
1950–1957: Hans Klüber
1957–1974: Georg Dietrich
1974–1980: Walter Buckpesch
1980–1986: Walter Suermann
1986–1994: Wolfgang Reuter
1994–2006: Gerhard Grandtke
2006–2018: Horst Schneider
2018–: Felix Schwenke

City council 
The Offenbach city council (Stadtverordnetenversammlung) governs the city alongside the mayor. The most recent city council election was held on 14 March 2021, and the results were as follows:

! colspan=2| Party
! Lead candidate
! Votes
! %
! +/-
! Seats
! +/-
|-
| bgcolor=| 
| align=left| Social Democratic Party (SPD)
| align=left| Felix Schwenke
| 610,508
| 28.4
|  3.6
| 20
|  2
|-
| bgcolor=| 
| align=left| Alliance 90/The Greens (Grüne)
| align=left| Sybille Schumann
| 390,305
| 18.1
|  3.6
| 13
|  3
|-
| bgcolor=| 
| align=left| Christian Democratic Union (CDU)
| align=left| Roland Walter
| 389,099
| 18.1
|  6.0
| 13
|  4
|-
| bgcolor=| 
| align=left| The Left (Die Linke)
| align=left| Sven Malsy
| 183,773
| 8.5
|  0.7
| 6
| ±0
|-
| bgcolor=| 
| align=left| Alternative for Germany (AfD)
| align=left| Christin Thüne
| 157,125
| 7.3
|  1.7
| 5
|  1
|-
| bgcolor=| 
| align=left| Free Democratic Party (FDP)
| align=left| Dominik Schwagereit
| 134,284
| 6.2
|  3.3
| 4
|  3
|-
| bgcolor=| 
| align=left| Free Voters (FW)
| align=left| Dennis Lehmann
| 91,446
| 4.2
|  1.5
| 3
|  1
|-
| 
| align=left| Forum New Offenbach (FNO)
| align=left| Muhsin Senol
| 57,626
| 2.7
|  0.2
| 2
| ±0
|-
| bgcolor=| 
| align=left| Pirate Party Germany (Piraten)
| align=left| Gregory Engels
| 46,459
| 2.2
|  0.5
| 2
|  1
|-
| bgcolor=| 
| align=left| Die PARTEI (PARTEI)
| align=left| Daniel Pfeiffer
| 34,957
| 1.6
|  1.1
| 1
|  1
|-
| 
| align=left| Young Offenbach (JO)
| align=left| Dominik Imeraj
| 28,525
| 1.3
|  0.0
| 1
| ±0
|-
| 
| align=left| Alliance for Innovation and Justice (BIG)
| align=left| Fikri Türet
| 27,574
| 1.3
| New
| 1
| New
|-
! colspan=3| Valid votes
! 32,424
! 96.1
! 
! 
! 
|-
! colspan=3| Invalid votes
! 1,308
! 3.9
! 
! 
! 
|-
! colspan=3| Total
! 33,732
! 100.0
! 
! 71
! ±0
|-
! colspan=3| Electorate/voter turnout
! 94,827
! 35.6
!  2.7
! 
! 
|-
| colspan=8| Source: Statistics Hesse
|}

Twin towns – sister cities

Offenbach am Main is twinned with:

 Puteaux, France (1955)
 Esch-sur-Alzette, Luxembourg (1956)
 Mödling, Austria (1956)
 Saint-Gilles, Belgium (1956)
 Tower Hamlets, England, United Kingdom (1956)
 Zemun (Belgrade), Serbia (1956)
 Velletri, Italy (1957)
 Rivas, Nicaragua (1986)
 Kawagoe, Japan (1983)
 Oryol, Russia (1988)

 Yangzhou, China (1997)

Demographics
Offenbach has a large non-German population. In 2016, foreign nationals made up 37% of the population. The largest communities are, in that order, from Turkey, Greece, Romania, Poland and Italy. According to census data, Offenbach and Duisburg had the highest share of Muslim migrants of all German districts in 2011.

Population history

Until the end of the 17th century, Offenbach remained a small town with less than a thousand inhabitants. With the coming into power of the count Johann Philipp in 1685, the city began to develop and the population rose steadily. In the 19th century the city became industrialized and the population increased even tenfold. 
Offenbach is one of the German cities where Germans without migrant background make up a minority of the population. As of 31 December 2012, approx. 44.3% of residents or 55,047 people had no foreign background. In contrast to that, there were 55.7% or 69,214 people with at least one non-German grandparent. The largest of those groups are:

|}

Economy

Until the early 1970s Offenbach was dominated by the machine-building and leather industries. The city hosts the German Association for Electrical, Electronic and Information Technologies to this day. The Deutscher Wetterdienst, commonly abbreviated as DWD, (translated from German as German Meteorological Service), residing in the Westend district.

Offenbach was also the European center of typography, with Gebr. Klingspor and Linotype (inventors of Optima or Palatino typeface) moving to nearby Eschborn in the 1970s and MAN Roland printing machines still a major employer today. Typography and design still remain important with a cluster of graphic design and industrial design companies, as well as the university level Hochschule für Gestaltung Offenbach am Main (HfG) design school and the Klingspor Museum.

In recent years Offenbach has become a popular location for a wide array of services, especially from the transport sectors. Offenbach is the host to the European headquarters of Honda, Hyundai Motors and Kumho Tires.

Arts and culture

Attractions

In Offenbach there is no specific Old Town, but there are several buildings which survived bombing during the war and have been restored. One of them is the Neo-baroque palace Büsingpalais with the Büsingpark, reconstructed in the 1980s. Today it is used as a congress center close to the Sheraton hotel. Between the shopping area and the Main, is the Lilipark and the Lilitemple, named after Johann Wolfgang von Goethe's fiancée Lili Schönemann. It is today used by the Offenbach Design University which is next to it. There is also a neoclassic palace in the borough Rumpenheim, the Rumpenheimer Schloss it now serves exclusively as domestic dwellings but the park is public.
Isenburger Schloss, a Renaissance building, now used by the Offenbach Design University
Büsingpalais with Büsingpark
Wilhelmsplatz a square with coffee houses and three times a week a market.
Buildings of the French Protestant Church and the French Protestant Community.
Rumpenheim Palace.
Former Synagogue "Capitol" (now a concert hall next to the new Synagogue).
The Westend Quarter (19th century).
Several art deco apartment houses.
Buildings by early 20th century architect Hugo Eberhardt: "Heyne" Factory, main building of the Design University, AOK Insurance building.
Prefabricated houses by Egon Eiermann in Lauterborn

Events
There are several festivals in Offenbach, some of these are:
 Lichterfest im Büsing-Park (festival of lights in the park of the Büsing palais)
 Nacht der Museen (with Frankfurt)
 Mainuferfest
 Cross Media Night

Museums
 German Leather Museum
 Klingspor Museum, museum of typography and calligraphy
 Haus der Stadtgeschichte, municipal historical museum
 Rosenheim-Museum for the painter Bernd Rosenheim

Sports

Kickers Offenbach football club was founded in 1901.

Infrastructure

Transport

Roads
The streets of central Offenbach are usually congested with cars during the rush hour. Some areas, especially around the shopping streets, are pedestrian-only streets. There are numerous car parks located throughout the city. The Offenbacher Kreuz is an Autobahn interchange where the Autobahnen A 3 (Cologne-Würzburg) and A 661  meet. The A661 crosses the A 3 (Cologne-Würzburg) and A 5 (Basel-Hannover).

Public transport
The city is connected by a major line of the S-Bahn railway system to Frankfurt. The station in the city center is Marktplatz. In general, six stations are located in Offenbach: Offenbach-Kaiserlei, Offenbach-Ledermuseum, Offenbach-Marktplatz, Offenbach-Ost, Offenbach-Bieber, Offenbach-Waldhof. Trains run every 5–10 minutes between Offenbach and Frankfurt. A 24 hours Service between both cities was introduced in 2013. The journey from Offenbach Marktplatz to Frankfurt Main Station takes 15 minutes, Frankfurt Airport can be reached within 26 minutes.
Suburban trains run underground in downtown Offenbach. The city tunnel was opened in 1996. Services split up at Offenbach-Ost Station to Hanau (S8 and S9 trains), Rödermark (S1) and Dietzenbach (S2).
An often-addressed problem is that there is no direct interchange between regional and suburban trains in Offenbach, since the lines were separated when the tunnel was built. Therefore, residents and city officials have proposed several times that platforms for regional trains should be added to the Offenbach-Ost Station.

The city's municipal public transportation services are operated by the "Offenbacher Verkehrsbetriebe" (OVB) and its subcontractors.
Nine routes (numbered 101–108 and 120) connect all boroughs with the major train stations at Marktplatz, Offenbach-Ost and Kaiserlei as well as the Central Station. The bus network has a very good coverage and frequency of service. All routes except for number 102 and number 107 busses stop at Marktplatz station, making it the most important transit hub in the city. Buses usually run with a 15-minute headway on working days and a 30-minute headway on Sundays, public holidays and after 8:00 pm.
Exemptions are routes 103, 107 and 120 which run every 30 minutes. Although number 103 and 120 buses share most of their route, creating a 15-minute headway on the shared section in downtown Offenbach. Those two routes also connect the city of Offenbach with its surrounding towns, Frankfurt am Main, Mühlheim am Main and Obertshausen.
Out of all municipal bus services the number 101 bus is the most frequented route. It runs every 7 or 8 minutes Mondays through Fridays. Service on the other most frequented routes (104 and 105) is also increased to a 7/8-minute headway during rush hours.
In addition to the municipal bus services there are regional buses that serve the city. Two express bus routes connect Offenbach to the city of Langen (route X83) and Bad Vilbel (X97). Other services are the number OF-30 bus to Heusenstamm, the 41 bus to Fechenheim as well as the 551 to Gravenbruch, Enkheim and Bad Vilbel.

Regional trains stop at the Offenbach Central Station in the city's center. The station is on the Frankfurt-Hanau main line which is one of railway with the most traffic in Germany. Mostly hourly service for Wächsersbach, Fulda, Würzburg and Erbach call at the Offenbach Central Station.
There is no long-distance train service at central station, although many high-speed trains pass through on their way from Frankfurt to Munich, Berlin or Hamburg.
The station lost most of its importance when the suburban trains were re-routed through the newly build tunnel beneath Berliner Straße. Nonetheless a train ride from Offenbach Central Station to Frankfurt Central Station takes only ten minutes which makes it a much-appreciated route for commuters.

Frankfurt Airport
The airport can be reached by car or bus and has two train stations, one for regional and one for long-distance traffic. The S-Bahn lines S8 and S9 (direction "Offenbach Ost or "Hanau"), departing from the regional traffic station, take 25 minutes from the airport to get to Offenbach.

Notable people

Johann André (1741–1799), founder of the music publishing firm named after him
Moritz Wilhelm August Breidenbach (1796–1857), jurist
Salomon Formstecher (1808–1889), rabbi and philosopher
Philipp Mainländer (1841–1876), poet and philosopher
Siegfried Guggenheim (1873–1961), lawyer, notary and art collector
Richard Heyne (1882–1961), member of Landtag and producer
Christian Dell (1882–1974), industrial designer, factory designer on Bauhaus
Hans Halberstadt (1885–1966), American fencer
Prince Philipp of Hesse (1896–1980), prince and governor
Bernard von Brentano (1901–1964), writer, essayist and journalist
Heinrich von Brentano (1904–1964), conservative politician
Berthold Wolpe (1905–1989), typographer and type designer
Hans Hotter (1909–2003), opera singer
Helene Mayer (1910–1953), fencer, Olympic champion
Gottfried Böhm (1920–2021), architect who won the Pritzker Architecture Prize in 1986
Hermann Nuber (1935–2022), footballer
Ray Bumatai (1952–2005), musician, actor and singer
Jimmy Hartwig (born 1954), football player, manager and actor
Olli Dittrich (born 1956), actor and comedian
Smudo (born 1968), musician and rapper
Sven Beckert (born 1969), history professor at Harvard, winner of 2015 Bancroft Prize for Empire of Cotton
Helma Wennemers (born 1969), German organic chemist and professor
Christian Lammert (born 1969), political scientist
Christian Sievers (born 1969), journalist
Tarek Al-Wazir (born 1971), politician, Deputy of the Hessian Minister-President
Aykut Anhan (born 1985), musician and rapper

Notable residents
Jacob Frank (1726–1791), Jewish religious leader
Abraham Bing (1752–1841), rabbi
Rudolf Koch (1876–1934), typeface designer, calligrapher and university professor
Friedrich Kellner (1885–1970), official and justice inspector, attended Goethschule here
Heinrich Kaminski (1886–1946), composer, worked here
Ignatz Wiemeler (1895–1952), bookbinder and university professor
Fritz Kredel (1900–1973), German-American artist and graphic designer, studied here
Regina Jonas (1902–1944), first female Rabbi, ordained in Offenbach
Karlgeorg Hoefer (1914–2000), calligrapher and typographer
Cornelia Hanisch (born 1952), fencer, Olympic winner
Dieter Müller (born 1954), footballer
Rudi Völler (born 1960), football player and manager
Götz Otto (born 1967), actor
Anthony Rother (born 1972), electronic musician

Gallery

References

External links

 
  

 
Cities in Hesse
Populated places on the Main basin
Populated riverside places in Germany
Historic Jewish communities
Grand Duchy of Hesse